The 2015 Bank of the West Classic was a professional tennis tournament played on hard courts. It was the 44th edition of the tournament, which was part of the WTA Premier tournaments of the 2015 WTA Tour, making it the longest-running women's only tennis tournament. It took place in Stanford, California, United States between 3 and 9 August 2015. It was the first women's event on the 2015 US Open Series.

Points and prize money

Point distribution

Prize money

Singles main-draw entrants

Seeds

 1 Rankings are as of July 27, 2015.

Other entrants
The following players received wildcards into the singles main draw:
  Catherine Bellis
  Agnieszka Radwańska
  Caroline Wozniacki
  Carol Zhao

The following players received entry from the qualifying draw:
  Kateryna Bondarenko
  Kimiko Date-Krumm
  Misaki Doi
  Nicole Gibbs

Withdrawals
Before the tournament
  Garbiñe Muguruza → replaced by  Tatjana Maria
  Kateřina Siniaková → replaced by  Ajla Tomljanović
  Serena Williams → replaced by  Aleksandra Krunić

Doubles main-draw entrants

Seeds

1 Rankings are as of July 27, 2015.

Other entrants 
The following pair received wildcards into the main draw:
  Catherine Bellis /  Jacqueline Cako

Finals

Singles

   Angelique Kerber defeated  Karolína Plíšková, 6–3, 5–7, 6–4

Doubles

  Xu Yifan /  Zheng Saisai defeated  Anabel Medina Garrigues /  Arantxa Parra Santonja, 6–1, 6–3

References

External links
Official website

Bank of the West Classic
Silicon Valley Classic
Sports in Stanford, California
2015 in sports in California